The Tabernacle is a centre for the performing arts in Machynlleth, Powys, Wales. It is located in a former Wesleyan chapel, which was converted in the mid-1980s and opened in 1986. Since then the Museum of Modern Art has grown up alongside it, with six exhibition spaces.

The Tabernacle' Auditorium seats 350 people and regularly hosts chamber and choral music, drama, lectures and conferences. It also has translation booths, a grand piano, recording facilities and a cinema screen. There is a bar in the foyer. There are music teaching rooms and an art studio in Ty Llyfnant. The Green Room doubles as a Language Laboratory where Lifelong learning classes are held.

The Machynlleth Festival takes place in the Auditorium in late August every year.

Since acquiring accreditation from the Museums, Archives and Libraries Division of the Welsh Government in 2016, the Trust owning the Tabernacle is now known as "MOMA Machynlleth".

See also
MOMA, Wales

Further reading
 Michael Fraser: Graham Arnold: A Retrospective/ Ol Syllu (Machynlleth Tabernacle Trust, Machynlleth, 1992) 
Icons in Oil: Portraits from the Lambert Collection (Machynlleth Tabernacle Trust, Machynlleth, 1993) 
 Eric Rowan & Carolyn Stewart: An Elusive Tradition: Art and Society in Wales, 1870–1950 (University of Wales Press, Cardiff, 2002) 
 D. Huw Owen: Capeli Cymru (Y Lolfa, Talybont, 2005)

External links
Official Webpage

Theatres in Wales
Chapels in Powys
Methodist churches in Wales
Former Methodist churches in the United Kingdom
Event venues established in 1986